The EKW C-35 was a 1930s Swiss two-seat reconnaissance biplane aircraft built by the Swiss Federal Construction Works (Eidgenoessische Konstruktionswerkstaette, K+W), Thun.

Development
Two aircraft were designed by the Eidgenössische Konstruktions Werkstätte to replace the Fokker C.Ve which the Swiss Air Force were using.  The two projects were the EKW C-35 biplane and the EKW C-36 monoplane.  After evaluation the air force ordered 40 C-35s in 1936.  Additional aircraft were built from spares.
The C-35 was a two-seat biplane with fixed tailwheel landing gear and conventional tail unit. The aircraft was powered by a Hispano-Suiza HS-77 V-12 piston engine (licence-built Hispano-Suiza 12Ycrs).

Operational history
The first aircraft was delivered to the Swiss Air Force in May 1937, and all had been delivered by the end of 1938. To supplement the aircraft in-service a further eight aircraft were built between 1941 and 1942 from spares. The aircraft were removed from front-line service in 1943 when replaced by the F&W C-3603 and transferred to night-flying units. The aircraft was withdrawn from service in 1954.

Operators

Swiss Air Force

Specifications (C-35)

References

Bibliography

Aircraft manufactured in Switzerland
1930s Swiss military reconnaissance aircraft
Single-engined tractor aircraft
Biplanes
Aircraft first flown in 1930